Kyzyl-Tuu is a village in the Naryn Region of Kyrgyzstan. It is part of the At-Bashy District. Its population was 2,291 in 2021.

References
 

Populated places in Naryn Region